Taizō Kawashima is a Japanese production designer and art director. He was nominated for an Academy Award in the category Best Art Direction for the film Tora! Tora! Tora!.

Selected filmography
 Tora! Tora! Tora! (1970)

References

External links

Year of birth missing
Possibly living people
Japanese production designers
Japanese art directors